"Porque Eu Sei que É Amor" is a single by Titãs, released in July 2009. It is composed by Sérgio Britto and Paulo Miklos and sung by the latter. The song is featured at the soundtrack of Rede Globo's telenovela Cama de Gato.

The song reached No. 14 at Brasil Hot 100 Airplay and No. 8 at the Brasil Hot Pop.

Music video 
A music video for the single was released.  The video features images of some women, with close-ups of their faces. Paulo Miklos, Tony Bellotto and Branco Mello are briefly shown through the video, directed by Branco Mello himself and Diana Bouth.

Personnel 
 Paulo Miklos - Lead vocals
 Branco Mello - Bass guitar
 Tony Bellotto - Electric guitar
 Sérgio Britto - Keyboards and backing vocals
 Charles Gavin - Drums
 Rick Bonadio - Acoustic guitar and percussion
 Eric Silver - Violins, Violas and String arrangement (string were recorded in Nashville, Tennessee, at Studio Club 703 by Marc Lacuesta

References

External links 
 "Porque Eu Sei que É Amor" video at Titãs' official YouTube channel

2009 singles
Titãs songs
2009 songs
Songs written by Sérgio Britto
Songs written by Paulo Miklos